The siege of Q'veli or Siege of Q'ueli was the last major military engagement during the Sajid invasion of Georgia in 914. The 28-day long siege resulted in pyrrhic Muslim victory and execution of the Georgian commander Gobron. Despite the important victory, the invaders were unable to maintain a strong foothold in western Georgia and were forced to withdraw.

Background
The most detailed information about the event is described by a contemporary Georgian hagiographer Stephen of Tbeti in his best-known work Passion of Gobron.  Before beginning their destructive campaign in Georgian kingdoms and principalities, the Sajids overran Caucasian Albania and Armenia, executing king Smbat I. After pillaging 87 settlements in eastern Georgia and capturing Ujarma and Bochorma fortresses in Kakheti, the Sajid ruler of Azerbaijan, known as Abu l'Kasim in Georgia and Yusuf ibn Abi'l-Saj elsewhere, launched his massive army to Uplistsikhe, only to find the fortifications demolished by their defenders in order to prevent him from gaining a foothold in the vicinity. From there, the amir surged into Samtskhe and Javakheti. Unable to seize control of the stronghold of Tmogvi, he besieged the castle of Q'ueli (Q'uelis-Tsikhe), which was a fief of a prominent Georgian feudal, Gurgen II of Tao.

Siege
The defense of the fortress was headed by Gobron, a military commander on Gurgen's court. The size of the Muslim army, which included siege engines, was so colossal that the camps set up by its soldiers would cover the expanses of five villages:

The Georgians, despite being vastly outnumbered, sporadically launched sorties, inflicting heavy casualties on the opposing force.  On the other hand, the Muslims constantly bombarded the castle walls and fortifications with catapults and trebuchets, gradually bringing the castle walls down. At the twenty-eighth day of the siege, the walls came down and the fortress was overrun, putting the most of its defenders in captivity.

Aftermath
Despite the large ransom sent by Gurgen, Yusuf refused to release his prisoners and decided to hold onto Mikel-Gobron as well as 133 others. Gobron, despite Yusuf's multiple attempts, firmly rejected to convert to Islam. According to The Passion of the Holy Martyr Gobron, the Georgian commander who was stubbornly refusing Yusuf's proposal, was ordered to bow down for execution. After the first strike of the sword, Gobron made the sign of the cross with blood on his forehead and exclaimed, "I thank you, Lord Jesus Christ, that you have accounted me, the most contemptible and chief among sinners, worthy to lay down my life for your sake!". The enraged Muslim general ordered the rest of the men to be massacred and their bodies left to the wild beasts. Despite securing the hard-earned castle of Q'ueli, the Sajids were forced to evacuate Tao-Klarjeti due to increasing Georgian power in the west. The general partisan warfare strategy carried out by the Georgians inflicted heavy casualties to the invaders during their campaign in western Georgia.

Notes

References

Further reading
 Silogava, Valeri; Shengelia, Kakha (2007). "History of Georgia: From the Ancient Times Through the Rose Revolution". Caucasus University Publishing House, Tbilisi. .
 Machitadze, Zakaria (2006). "Lives of the Georgian Saints". St. Herman of Alaska Brotherhood. .
 Thomas, David; Mallet, Alexander; Roggema, Barbara (2010). "Christian-Muslim Relations: A Bibliographical History: Volume 2 (900-1050)". BRILL Publishing. .
 "Hagiographic Compilation", Literacy Publishing, 2011.
 Rayfield, Donald (2013). The Literature of Georgia: A History. Routledge publishing. .
 Fähnrich, Heinz (2011). Die georgische Sprache, BRILL, .
 Mayeur, Jean-Marie; Dagron, Gilbert; Riché, Pierre; Vauchez, Andre (1993). Evêques, moines et empereurs: 610-1054. Desclée publishing, .

Queli
Queli
Queli